Kellys Slough National Wildlife Refuge was established to develop and manage a system of wetlands and grasslands that is unique to the Red River Valley. The Refuge supports a diversity of wetland and grassland wildlife, while providing for wildlife-dependent recreation, interpretation, and education. Kellys Slough National Wildlife Refuge is located in the heart of the Red River Valley. The Refuge contains an intermittent stream that flows into the Turtle River, a tributary of the Red River.  The Refuge covers portions of Blooming, Lakeville and Rye Townships of Grand Forks County.

References
Refuge website

National Wildlife Refuges in North Dakota
Protected areas of Grand Forks County, North Dakota
Wetlands of North Dakota
Landforms of Grand Forks County, North Dakota